Heide (Holst) station is a junction station in the town of Heide in the district of Dithmarschen in the German state of Schleswig-Holstein. The Hamburg–Elmshorn–Heide–Westerland, the Neumünster–Heide and the Heide–Büsum lines cross here.

History 

The station was built in 1877 by the West Holstein Railway Company (Westholsteinische Eisenbahn-Gesellschaft) along with its main line from Neumünster. This line continued to Karolinenkoog as the Heide–Karolinenkoog railway, including a ferry to Tönning opened in 1876. In 1878, the Marsh Railway was extended to the station, giving a direct connections to Hamburg via Itzehoe and Elmshorn. The line was extended to Husum in 1886, using part of the Karolinenkoog branch. In 1883, the West Holstein Railway also completed a branch to Büsum. The premises of the Norderdithmarschen District Railway (Kreisbahn Norderdithmarschen) were in the station forecourt from 1905 to 1938. It operated a metre gauge railway from Heide to places in the Geest country of the northern Dithmarschen district. Its terminus and loading tracks were to the northeast of the state railway station. The relatively large entrance and administration building of the Norderdithmarschen District Railway is now used as a youth centre and a music school, among other things. The Heide workshop, which was responsible for the provision of locomotives and wagons, was at the southern end of the station from 1878 to 1978.

Operations 

Regional services are operated over the Marsh Railway between Hamburg and Westerland (Sylt) by the Nord-Ostsee-Bahn (which is owned by Veolia Verkehr) in both directions every hour. There are also some InterCity services operated by Deutsche Bahn. Between the hourly through trains between Westerland and Hamburg, Nord-Ostsee-Bahn generally operates Regionalbahn services between Heide and Itzehoe offset by about half an hour.

Nord-Ostsee-Bahn also operates hourly services on the Heide-Büsum line, continuing on the Neumünster–Heide line every two hours. Every hour, trains on all lines meet in Heide and thus form a node in the basic interval timetable of Schleswig-Holstein.

The railway lines that meet in Heide are not electrified.

Railway infrastructure 

The old station building was located on an island between the current tracks 1 and 2 (tracks 2 and 1 until 2011) on the Marsh Railway and 4 and 5 (tracks 101–103 until 2011) on the line to Büsum and Neumünster. This was demolished at the beginning of May 2011 and replaced by a new but much smaller single-storey building on the western side of the railway facilities, which was taken into operations in the early summer of 2013. For this reason, the tracks were re-numbered starting from the west, while previously they were numbered starting from the central platform in each case. Since the beginning of 2013, the old island platform has been completely removed and dismantled.

Platform tracks 

Since its reconstruction the station has five platform tracks. The scheduled use of the tracks is as follows:
track 1: long-distance and regional services to Hamburg;
track 2: long-distance and regional services to Westerland;
track 3: Regionalbahn services to and from Itzehoe;
track 4: regional services from Neumünster to Büsum;
track 5: regional services from Büsum to Neumünster.

Until 2011, the tracks were used as follows:
track 1: long-distance and regional services to Westerland;
track 2: long distance and regional services to Hamburg and regional services to Itzehoe;
track 101: most recently disused, previously to and from Itzehoe;
track 102: regional services to and from Büsum and Neumünster and regional services to and from Itzehoe;
Track 103: regional services to and from Büsum and Neumünster.

Notes

External links 

 

Railway stations in Schleswig-Holstein
Railway stations in Germany opened in 1877